The Hog Park Guard Station, in Routt National Forest in Jackson County, Colorado about  west of Cowdrey, Colorado, was built during 1910 to 1912.  It was listed on the National Register of Historic Places in 2003.

The station is a two-room log cabin, built of round logs.

Besides the cabin, the listing included two other contributing buildings:  a log storage shed and a privy.

It is located on the west bank of the Encampment River, in an area that was logged for railroad ties during 1900 to 1907.

The Ellis Trail goes through the complex.

References

Ranger stations
Log cabins
National Register of Historic Places in Jackson County, Colorado
Buildings and structures completed in 1912